A nontransporting EMS vehicle, also known as a fly-car, response vehicle, quick response service (QRS) vehicle, or fast response vehicle, is a vehicle that responds to and provides emergency medical services (EMS) without the ability to transport patients. For patients whose condition requires transport (e.g. to a hospital), an ambulance is necessary. In some cases they may fulfill other duties when not participating in EMS operations, such as policing or fire suppression.

Vehicle types

Non-transporting EMS vehicles come in many sizes and types, from bicycles and golf-carts that can access pedestrian walkways; to motorcycles that are able to fit through stopped or slow traffic; to sedans, station wagons, vans (referred to as "vanbulances"), and SUVs that can carry almost as much equipment as an ambulance; to fire engines that carry large crews and may carry specialized equipment.  Essentially, any vehicle that lacks the ability to transport a patient may be used, depending on the needs of the local EMS system.

Purpose

A non-transporting EMS vehicle can help emergency organizations use their resources more efficiently, assessing an incident's severity (especially where there is reason to suspect the injury or illness is not serious) and either treating the patient at the scene and then releasing them or calling in additional help if required.  This saves resources on several levels, as most non-transporting vehicles cost much less than full-size ambulances, and because they may be staffed by a single person (ambulances require a minimum of two crew members).  Non-transporting vehicles may be used by ranking EMS officers, who may need to move between calls to complete their supervisory duties, or by more highly or specially trained medical responders (e.g. a paramedic versus an emergency medical technician, or a physician, found commonly in European systems), saving those with higher or specialized training from being ensnared in calls that can be capably handled by emergency responders with a more basic level of training.

Non-transporting vehicles can also be used to improve response times.  In areas such as busy roads, smaller nontransporting  vehicles are able to move through traffic faster than full size ambulances can.  Some non-transporting vehicles may also have off-road capabilities, giving them access to areas that traditional ambulances cannot reach.  Golf carts and similar vehicles provide access to grassy areas, amusement parks, and inside large buildings, such as shopping malls.

Fielding multiple non-transporting vehicles may enable the EMS system to increase the number of units it has available to respond without the greater costs (money and personnel) associated with full-sized ambulances.  Adding EMS capabilities to preexisting police or fire units yields similar results.

Examples

Several European countries, such as Germany, Belgium and Austria, with physician-led emergency services, there are Emergency Physician Rapid Response Cars (in German called NEF from Notarzteinsatzfahrzeug — "emergency physician deployment vehicle"), staffed with at least an emergency physician and a paramedic. These physicians are generally only called out to serious calls to coordinate multiple ambulances or provide intense on-scene care to serious or critical patients; paramedics and EMTs in ambulances generally can handle most calls by themselves.

In the Swedish medical system, a non-transporting vehicle (akutbil) can be equipped with a nurse specialized in anesthesia who is specialized in pain management, paired together with a paramedic. These vehicles can be staffed around the clock or during the busiest hours of the day and week in order to augment the capacity of the prehospital care provider and can respond both independently and in conjunction with one or more ambulances, air ambulance(s) and other emergency services. As a result of new (circa 2013) legislation requiring all ambulances to be equipped with at least one trained nurse, non-transporting vehicles have become less common.

In Belgium, a non-transporting vehicle (called Mobiele Urgentiegroep (MUG) in Dutch, Service Mobile d' Urgence et de Réanimation (SMUR) in French) is equipped with at least one emergency physician and one nurse specialized in intensive and emergency care. Standard Belgian ambulances only have EMTs and/or nurses on board and only provide basic life support. Non-transporting vehicles are only sent out for serious emergencies like drug overdoses and cardiac arrests and provide advanced life support on top of the services provided by ambulance crews.

In France, emergency medicine is generally handled by two services, the Fire Department red ambulances which provide basic life support, and Hospital-based yellow or white vehicles who provide advanced life support ambulances and emergency physicians who use fly-cars. In the French model of prehospital care, doctors may remain on scene to attempt procedures to stabilise patients prior to transport.

In the United States, several fire departments and private ambulance services have fly-car programs. The Fire Department of the City of New York (FDNY) added EMS capabilities to many of their fire engines, effectively adding dozens of EMS units to their fleet without having to purchase or staff additional ambulances. In 2016, the FDNY launched a formal EMS fly-car program to reduce EMS response times; this practice was suspended in March 2020 due to the COVID-19 pandemic. The program received criticism from the FDNY EMS union, which argued that the fly-car program siphoned personnel and resources from the regular EMS ambulance service. Hatzalah, a Jewish volunteer EMS in New York City, operates a two-tiered dispatch model where EMTs and paramedics respond to a call in their fully equipped private vehicles acting as fly-cars, while an ambulance is brought for transport if necessary.

In Israel, Magen David Adom and other EMS organizations use motorcycles as non-transporting EMS vehicles to reach patients.

See also

 Ambulance
 Motorcycle ambulance
 Air medical services

References

Ambulances